The aim of the 1836 Battle of Constantine was to conquer the Algerian city of Constantine; the attack was a French failure.

The expedition 
Commanded by Clauzel, the French expeditionary force amounting to 8,040 men and 30 officers, left Bône on November 9; on the 18th, it crossed the pass of Râs-el-Akba and was only two marches from Constantine. After an encampment at Raz-Oued-Zenati, the French army endured difficult climatic conditions. The army had reached very high areas; during the night rain, snow and hail fell with such abundance and continuity that the soldiers, in the bivouac, were exposed to all the rigors of a Russian winter; the land, completely broken up, recalled the mud of Poland. The army marched further on the 20th,  and arrived, with the exception of the baggage and a rear guard, at Constantine, where it was forced to stop. The cold was excessive. Several men had their feet frozen; others perished during the night, because since in Raz-el-Akba there was not enough wood to start a fire. Finally, the reinforcements, thanks to which the teams were doubled and tripled, having joined the army, the French army crossed the Bou-Merzoug, one of the tribes of the Wadi Rhummel, on the 21st, and took up position under the walls of Constantine. The city was defended by nature itself: a ravine 60 meters wide, immense depth, and at the bottom of which flows the Rhummel wadi, presents for escarp and counterscarp a sheer-cut rock, unassailable by mine as by the ball. The Mansourah plateau was connected to the city by a very narrow bridge leading to a very strong double door, well defended by the musketry fires of the houses and gardens which surround it.

The siege 
Marshal Clauzel occupied the plateau of Mansourah with the Duke of Nemours and the troops of General Trézel; General de Rigny was ordered to seize the hills of Koudiat-Aty, to pacify the marabouts and the cemeteries in front of the Ez-Rabahah gate and to block this gate. However, it was impossible for the French army to lead on this point, as the field artillery, was not yet ready. Ahmed Bey shut himself up in Constantine, while he entrusted its defense to his general (Khalifa) Ben Aïssa, who has recruited about 1,200 soldiers, all of whom were determined to defend the city from French colonialism.

The French avant-garde brigade moved to the heights where resistance was successfully defeated. The marshal directed artillery fire against the El-Cantara gate. On the 22nd, this brigade fought against the Muslims who came out through doors that the French army could not block. The weather continued to be dreadful: the snow was falling in large flakes, the wind was freezing and finally ammunition and food were exhausted.  On the 23rd, a new attack against the French who were repulsed. Two simultaneous attacks on the French, on the night of 23-24, were semi-successful, as many French soldiers were put out of action, either killed, wounded, or captured.

French Retreat 
On the 24th, the marshal ordered the retreat. This first day was very difficult; the entire garrison and a multitude of cavalry attacked the rear guard fiercely, including Commander Changarnier, of the 2nd light infantry. Surrounded by enemies, he formed his battalion in a square and, at the moment of a terrible attack, opened a fire of two ranks at close range, which covered three sides of the square with men and horses. On the 26th, the French army camped at Sidi Tamtam. On the 27th, she had passed the difficult parade which led to the Ras el Agba pass, and the Muslims abandoned their pursuit. On the 28th, she reached Guelma where she left her patients. The losses amounted to 1,000 men for the retreat alone.

References 
Translated from the French wikipedia's page on the subject Siége de Constantine (1836)

The information in this article is based on that in its French equivalent.

Conflicts in 1836
Sieges involving France
Constantine, Algeria
1830s in Algeria
1836 in Africa
Constantine